St Marysile Kolapathakam  is a 2015 Indian Malayalam language crime thriller film produced by K.P. Rajendran under the banner of Krishnajali Movie Productions. The film is written and directed by H. N Shijoy with Sudheer Karamana in the lead role along with Aparna Nair, Sreejith Vijay, Indrans and Poojitha Menon. The Music is composed by Viswajith.

Plot 
The whole story revolves around a murder that takes place in St Mary's Hostel in Trivantrum. Pooja is a sales girl in one of the famous textiles in Trivantrum. Her best friend is Meera. Both of them stay at St Mary's hostel. One day they come to know that one of the inhabitants of the hostel is missing and later found murdered in the hostel. Later police officer Solomon arrives to investigate the murder. The investigation leads to many twists and turns. The film also shows how a police investigation affects the lives of people who are related to the victim.

Cast 
Sudheer Karamana as CI Solomon Peter
Aparna Nair as Pooja
Sreejith Vijay as Sanjay     
Rohith Menon as Emerson Clement  
Usuf Ali as CI Roshan Jose
Indrans as Security Rasheed
Satheesh Vettikkavala as Autodriver Sathyan
Poojitha Menon as Veena Susan
Anju Raj as Meera Sanjay 
Leena Nair as Merin
Aparna P Nair as Rakhy
Veena Shivaprasad as Jyothsna

See also
 Cocktail
Madhura Naranga

References

External links 

2010s Malayalam-language films
2015 films